Augustus Richard "Gus" Kenworthy (born October 1, 1991) is a British-American former freestyle skier, actor, and YouTuber. He has competed in slopestyle, halfpipe, and big air. Kenworthy won the silver medal in men's slopestyle at the 2014 Winter Olympics in Sochi. As of 2019 Kenworthy represents Great Britain. He was cast as Chet Clancy in the ninth season of the horror anthology series American Horror Story: 1984.

Early life and education
Kenworthy was born in Chelmsford, Essex to an English mother, Heather "Pip" Tyler, and an American father, Peter Kenworthy. He has two older brothers, Hugh and Nick Kenworthy.

Peter Kenworthy, a former banker from Philadelphia who worked in London for several years, has been the executive director of the Mountainfilm film festival in Telluride, Colorado since 2006. Pip Kenworthy, originally from Bristol, England was born into a large family with eight siblings. After moving to London in the early 1970s, she began working backstage in costumes at the Kings Head Theatre Club. She also ran a vintage booth at Camden Lock Market. In 1993 when Gus Kenworthy was two years old, the family emigrated and settled in Telluride.

Kenworthy graduated from Telluride High School in June 2010. He could have graduated in 2009 but chose instead to take a year off to ski.

Career
Kenworthy won AFP World Championships overall titles in 2011, 2012, and 2013. In 2014, he placed second at the Olympics in Sochi, Russia and won his first medal, a bronze, at the X Games in Tignes, France in the slopestyle event. He won the World Cup Men's Halfpipe in Park City, Utah, in 2015 and again in 2016 in Mammoth, California, and finished second in 2017. He finished third in the Men's Slopestyle during the 2017 World Cup in Silvaplana, Switzerland.

In 2019, Kenworthy guest starred on RuPaul's Drag Race, All Stars 4, Episode 3, "Snatch Game of Love", as one of the available bachelors. Kenworthy joined the main cast in the ninth season of FX's anthology series American Horror Story as Chet Clancy. In December 2019, he announced he would compete for his birth nation, Great Britain. In February 2020, he won his first gold medal as a competitor for Great Britain. In January 2022, he made his final X Games competition competing in the Superpipe final. He finished his X Games career having made 32 appearances in the event and joining some of the greats of the sport.

At the 2022 Winter Olympics, Kenworthy competed for the last time. He qualified for the final in 12th and finished 8th in the final.

Personal life
In October 2015, Kenworthy publicly came out as gay in an interview with ESPN. He said in a later interview with Attitude magazine that he chose to come out on ESPN because "I wanted to do it in my words and once and for all–and hopefully help kids that are in the same position I was." Rolling Stone noted the "freestyle medalist is the first action-sports star to come out." He was in a relationship with Robin Macdonald, who was also involved in the ski industry, working in film and photography. The couple gained international media attention as a result of Macdonald texting him a photo of five stray dogs—four puppies and their mother—during their stay in Sochi, at the 2014 Winter Olympics. Macdonald stayed behind for more than a month to save the family of dogs, and others, while he fought to bring them home. Their adoption of these dogs helped bring further attention to the problematic rise of the stray dog population in Sochi, which grew significantly during the Olympics. The two eventually broke up after a five-year relationship.

From November 2015 to July 2019, Kenworthy was in a relationship with American theatre and film actor and reality television personality Matthew Wilkas. At the 2018 Winter Olympics, in Pyeongchang, South Korea, Wilkas kissed Kenworthy before his qualifying run in the men's slopestyle; the kiss was broadcast on live television and was lauded as being a significant moment for the visibility of LGBT athletes. In June 2017, Kenworthy received the HRC Visibility Award for his work in LGBT visibility in professional sports.

In 2017, Kenworthy was a cast member on the MTV series The Challenge: Champs vs. Pros, which featured former competitors as well as professional athletes. In 2018, he was chosen by Fierté Montréal as one of the six grand marshals for the Pride Parade. He announced his participation in AIDS/LifeCycle in 2019, aiming to raise $1 million to fight HIV/AIDS. He joined approximately 2,000 other cyclists on a 7-day, 545-mile cycling trip from San Francisco to Los Angeles. He raised a total of $249,745.

Kenworthy said he did not believe that boycotting the 2022 Olympics in China would solve any international human rights situations, and while in China, he spoke out against "human rights atrocities".

Filmography

Film

Television

Web series

Music videos

See also
 Homosexuality in modern sports
 Homosexuality in sports in the United States

References

External links
 
 
 
 
 
 
 
 Gus Kenworthy on YouTube Channel

1991 births
Living people
American male freestyle skiers
American YouTubers
English emigrants to the United States
English people of American descent
English video bloggers
English YouTubers
Freestyle skiers at the 2014 Winter Olympics
Freestyle skiers at the 2018 Winter Olympics
Freestyle skiers at the 2022 Winter Olympics
Gay sportsmen
LGBT people from Colorado
American LGBT sportspeople
LGBT YouTubers
American gay actors
Medalists at the 2014 Winter Olympics
Olympic freestyle skiers of the United States
Olympic silver medalists for the United States in freestyle skiing
Sportspeople from Chelmsford
People from Telluride, Colorado
Sportspeople from Colorado
The Challenge (TV series) contestants
X Games athletes
Male bloggers
LGBT skiers
British male freestyle skiers
20th-century LGBT people
21st-century LGBT people
English LGBT sportspeople